Filatima obidenna is a moth of the family Gelechiidae. It is found in North America, where it has been recorded from Arizona.

The wingspan is 17–20 mm. The forewings are dark fuscous. The costal fourth of the wing, from the base to the apical fourth, is white with fuscous irroration and the extreme base of the costa and two or three small spots within the white area near the base are black. The white costal colour at the basal fifth and the middle projects obliquely and transversely as incomplete fasciae to or slightly beyond the fold. The white colour extends across the wing at apical fourth to the tornus as an ill-defined transverse fascia. The white costal area along the inner margin is irregular longitudinal olivaceous scaling. The hindwings are 
pale shining greyish fuscous basally shading to fuscous apically.

References

Moths described in 1947
Filatima